Adesmus ventralis is a species of beetle in the family Cerambycidae. It was described by Gahan in 1894. It is known from Costa Rica.

References

Adesmus
Beetles described in 1894